The 2024 Summer Olympics will introduce the sport of breaking or breakdancing to the Summer Olympic program for the first time. There will be two medal events, one each for men and women, with 16 "b-boys" and "b-girls" competing. Breaking previously featured at the 2018 Summer Youth Olympics.  IOC President Thomas Bach stated that they added breakdancing as part of an effort to draw more interest from young people in the Olympics. The international organizing body is the World DanceSport Federation.

External links 

 Breaking at the Paris 2024 Olympic Games

References 

Sports at the Summer Olympics
Dancesport at multi-sport events